Rareș Vârtic (born 9 June 1985) is a former Romanian footballer midfielder.

External links
 RomanianSoccer
 Player profile on Liga1.ro

1985 births
Sportspeople from Târgu Mureș
Romanian footballers
Association football midfielders
ASA 2013 Târgu Mureș players
CSM Deva players
Liga I players
Living people
Association football defenders